James Paul Baker (born August 31, 1966) is a Canadian former ice hockey player, having played for the Quebec Nordiques, Ottawa Senators, San Jose Sharks, and Toronto Maple Leafs. He was a former radio personality for the San Jose Sharks and was their television color commentator from 2014 to 2020.

Playing career
Baker was selected by the Quebec Nordiques in the 1988 NHL Supplemental Draft. Following an outstanding college career with the St. Lawrence University Skating Saints, Baker went on to play in ten NHL seasons. In 404 career games, he tallied 71 goals and 150 points. Baker also appeared in 25 Stanley Cup playoff games. As a player, Baker is best known for scoring the series-winning goal for the San Jose Sharks in the seventh game of the 1994 Western Conference Quarterfinals against the heavily favored Detroit Red Wings. Baker is tied with Jeff Friesen for the Sharks single-season short-handed goals record with six, set in his 1995-96 season during which he scored 16 total goals.

In 2005–06 season, Baker returned to the San Jose Sharks, joining Dan Rusanowsky and David Maley on the Sharks' radio broadcast team. He called most games with Rusanowsky, although he would occasionally be replaced by Maley when sent on assignments for the organization. On occasions, Baker and Maley joined Rusanowsky in a popular "triple-cast" format. Beginning with the 2008–09 season, Baker formally hosted pre-game and post-game shows for Sharks games on NBC Sports Bay Area. He became Randy Hahn's color commentator on the Sharks' NBC Sports California broadcasts in 2014 after Drew Remenda's departure to a same role for the Edmonton Oilers, but this time, he called all Sharks home games from "Inside-the-Glass." From the 2018–19 season until 2020, he and Bret Hedican joined Randy Hahn in a popular "triple-cast" format.

Baker was also a co-coach of the Santa Clara Blackhawks CAHA state championship winning Bantam A team for the 2009–10 season.

Career statistics

Regular season and playoffs

References

External links

Jamie Baker biography on SJSharks.com

1966 births
Living people
Canadian ice hockey centres
Chicago Wolves (IHL) players
Halifax Citadels players
HIFK (ice hockey) players
Ice hockey people from Ottawa
National Hockey League broadcasters
National Hockey League supplemental draft picks
Ottawa Senators players
Quebec Nordiques draft picks
Quebec Nordiques players
St. Lawrence Saints men's ice hockey players
San Jose Sharks players
San Jose Sharks announcers
Toronto Maple Leafs players
Canadian expatriate ice hockey players in Finland